Waltheof, Earl of Northumbria (died 31 May 1076) was the last of the Anglo-Saxon earls and the only English aristocrat to be executed during the reign of William I.

Early life
Waltheof was the second son of Siward, Earl of Northumbria. His mother was Aelfflaed, daughter of Ealdred, Earl of Bernicia, son of Uhtred, Earl of Northumbria. In 1054, Waltheof's brother, Osbeorn, who was much older than he, was killed in battle, making Waltheof his father's heir. Siward himself died in 1055, and Waltheof being far too young to succeed as Earl of Northumbria, King Edward appointed Tostig Godwinson to the earldom.

Waltheof was said to be devout and charitable and was probably educated for a monastic life. Around 1065, however, he became an earl, governing Northamptonshire and Huntingdonshire. Following the Battle of Hastings he submitted to William and was allowed to keep his pre-Conquest title and possessions. He remained at William's court until 1068.

First revolt
When Sweyn II invaded Northern England in 1069, Waltheof and Edgar Aetheling joined the Danes and took part in the attack on York. He would again make a fresh submission to William after the departure of the invaders in 1070. He was restored to his earldom, and went on to marry William's niece, Judith of Lens. In 1071, he was appointed Earl of Northampton.

The Domesday Book mentions Waltheof ("Walleff"): "'In Hallam ("Halun"), one manor with its sixteen hamlets, there are twenty-nine carucates [~14 km²] to be taxed. There Earl Waltheof had an "Aula" [hall or court]. There may have been about twenty ploughs. This land Roger de Busli holds of the Countess Judith." (Hallam, or Hallamshire, is now part of the city of Sheffield)

In 1072, William expelled Gospatric from the earldom of Northumbria. Gospatric was Waltheof's cousin and had taken part in the attack on York with him, but like Waltheof, had been pardoned by William. Gospatric fled into exile and William appointed Waltheof as the new earl. Construction of Durham Castle began under Waltheof in 1072 after receiving orders to commence this project from William. The castle would be significantly expanded by Bishop Walcher and his successors in later years.

Waltheof had many enemies in the north. Amongst them were members of a family who had killed Waltheof's maternal great-grandfather, Uhtred the Bold, and his grandfather Ealdred. This was part of a long-running blood feud. In 1074, Waltheof moved against the family by sending his retainers to ambush them, succeeding in killing the two eldest of four brothers.

Second revolt and execution
In 1075 Waltheof was said to have joined the Revolt of the Earls against William. His motives for taking part in the revolt are unclear, as is the depth of his involvement. Some sources say that he told his wife - The Countess Judith - about the plot and that she then informed Archbishop Lanfranc who then told her uncle William, who was at the time in Normandy. Other sources say that it was Waltheof who told the bishop of the plot. On William's return from Normandy, Waltheof was arrested, brought twice before the king's court and sentenced to death.

He spent almost a year in confinement before being beheaded on 31 May 1076 at St. Giles's Hill, near Winchester. He was said to have spent the months of his captivity in prayer and fasting. Many people believed in his innocence and were surprised when the execution was carried out. His body was initially thrown into a ditch, but was later retrieved and buried in the chapter house of Crowland Abbey in Lincolnshire.

An otherwise unknown Norse poet, Þorkell Skallason, composed a memorial poem for Waltheof - Valþjófsflokkr. Two stanzas of this poem are preserved in Heimskringla, Hulda-Hrokkinskinna and, partially, Fagrskinna. The first of the two stanzas says that Waltheof made a hundred retainers of William burn in hot fire - "a scorching evening for the men" - and wolves ate the corpses of the Normans. The second says that William betrayed Waltheof and had him killed.

Cult of martyrdom

In 1092, after a fire in the chapter house, the abbot had Waltheof's body moved to a prominent place in the abbey church. When the coffin was opened, it is reported that the corpse was found to be intact with the severed head re-joined to the trunk. This was regarded as a miracle, and the abbey, which had a financial interest in the matter began to publicise it. As a result, pilgrims began to visit Waltheof's tomb. He was commemorated on 31 August.

After a few years, healing miracles were reputed to occur in the vicinity of Waltheof's tomb, often involving the restoration of the pilgrim's lost sight. They are described in the Miracula Sancti Waldevi. Waltheof's life thus became the subject of popular media, heroic but inaccurate accounts being preserved in the Vita et Passio Waldevi comitis, a Middle English Waltheof saga, since lost, and the Anglo-Norman Waldef.

Family and children
In 1070 Waltheof married Countess Judith de Lens, daughter of Lambert II, Count of Lens and Adelaide of Normandy, Countess of Aumale. Countess Judith was the niece of William the Conqueror. Waltheof and Judith had three children, the eldest of whom, Maud, brought the earldom of Huntingdon to her second husband, David I of Scotland, and another, Adelise (Alice of Northumbria) married the Anglo-Norman noble Raoul III of Tosny.

One of Waltheof's grandsons was Waltheof (died 1159), abbot of Melrose.

In popular culture
 Waltheof was portrayed by actor Marcus Gilbert in the TV drama Blood Royal: William the Conqueror (1990).
 Waltheof is the subject of Juliet Dymoke's 1970 historical novel Of the Ring of Earls
 Waltheof is a major character in Elizabeth Chadwick's 2002 historical novel The Winter Mantle
 Waltheof is a character in Parke Godwin's 1991 historical novel Sherwood

References

Sources
 
 Chronicle of Britain 
 
 
Joseph Bain, ed, Calendar of Documents relating to Scotland Preserved in Her Majesty's Public Record Office, London.(Edinburgh: H M General Register House, 1881), I:3, Digital Image Internet Archive http://thehennesseefamily.com/getperson.php?personID=I53812&tree=hennessee accessed 10 April 2021). No 13.

External links
 

1076 deaths
11th-century English nobility
History of Sheffield
People from Sheffield
People executed under the Normans
Executed English people
11th-century executions
People executed by the Kingdom of England by decapitation
Earls of Northampton
Earls of Huntingdon (1065 creation)
Earls of Northumbria (Peerage of England)